The 242nd Motor Rifle Division was a motorized infantry division of the Soviet Army. The division existed from 1972 to 1988 and was based in Abakan. The division became a storage base in 1989 and was disbanded in 2009.

History 
The 242nd Motor Rifle Division was activated in 1972 in Abakan as part of the Siberian Military District. In 1980, its 485th Motorized Rifle Regiment became independent and was transferred to Yurga, being replaced by the 192nd Motorized Rifle Regiment. The division became part of the 33rd Army Corps in 1985. During the Cold War, the division was maintained at 23% strength. On 1 December 1989, the division became the 5350th Weapons and Equipment Storage Base. In 1991, the storage base was transferred back into the Siberian Military District. The storage base was disbanded in 2009 as part of the Russian military reform.

Composition 
In 1988, the division included the following units. All units were based at Abakan unless noted.
 192nd Motorized Rifle Regiment
 486th Motorized Rifle Regiment (Chadan)
 489th Motorized Rifle Regiment (Kyzyl)
 164th Tank Regiment (Kyzyl)
 7th Artillery Regiment (Kyzyl)
 1326th Antiaircraft Artillery Regiment 
 Separate Missile Battalion
 Separate Antitank Artillery Company 
 172nd Separate Reconnaissance Battalion
 34th Separate Engineer-Sapper Battalion
 312th Separate Communications Battalion
 Separate Chemical Defence Company 
 Separate Equipment Maintenance and Recovery Battalion 
 Separate Medical Battalion 
 Separate  Material Supply Battalion

References 

Motor rifle divisions of the Soviet Union
Military units and formations established in 1972
Military units and formations disestablished in 1989